Stuart E. Hample (January 6, 1926 – September 19, 2010), also known as Stoo Hample, was an American children's book author, performer, playwright and cartoonist who sometimes used the pseudonyms Joe Marthen and Turner Brown, Jr. He is best known for the books Children's Letters to God and The Silly Book, and the comic strip Inside Woody Allen. He is the father of baseball collector Zack Hample.

Early life 
Hample began drawing before kindergarten. At the age of 17, he enlisted in the United States Navy   and served for two years in the Submarine Service during World War II. He attended Williams College and graduated from the University at Buffalo in 1950 with a B.A. in English and drama.

Career
In 1946, while working in advertising, he began performing as a musical cartoonist with symphony orchestras at children's and pops concerts, drawing in strict rhythm with the music. In 1948 he was the writer and star of the evening comedy show Cartoon Capers on WBEN-TV in Buffalo, NY and also of a children's show called Junior Jamboree on the same station. He was sometimes a guest host on the NBC Children's show Birthday House when the regular host, Paul Tripp, was unavailable. In the 1950s he appeared regularly on the CBS-TV children's program Captain Kangaroo as "Mister Artist."  

In 1955-56, he was an assistant to Al Capp. A subsequent stint in advertising ended when he created the syndicated comic strip, Inside Woody Allen. Because he simultaneously had another comic strip, Rich and Famous, running with a different syndicate, he briefly employed the pseudonym Joe Marthen, a conglomeration of the names of his children, Joe, Martha, and Henry.

During this period his first play, Alms for the Middle Class, had a simultaneous world premiere at the Pittsburgh Public Theater and Geva Theater (Rochester, New York) and was produced on Earplay, the dramatic workshop of National Public Radio. At the time of his death, he was working on All the Sincerity In Hollywood, a one-character play based on the life of radio comedian Fred Allen. The play had several readings directed by Austin Pendleton and starring Dick Cavett.

Works

Books
The Silly Book (1961)
Mr. Nobody & the Umbrella Bug (1962)
Doodles the Deer-Horse (1963)
Children's Letters to God (1966) (co-edited with Eric Marshall)
More Children's Letters to God (1967) (co-edited with Eric Marshall)
Blood for Holly Warner (1967)
My Darling Mao (1968)
Black Is (1969 - under pseudonym Turner Brown, Jr.)
God is a Good Friend to Have (1969)
Stoo Hample's Silly Joke Book (1978)
Non-Being & Somethingness (1978)
Hugging, Hitting & Other Family Matters (1979)
Yet Another Big, Fat, Funny Silly Book (1980)
Children's Letters to God (1991) (co-edited with Eric Marshall)
Dear Mr. President (1993)
Grandma, Grandpa & Me (1997)
Me & My Dad (1999)
My Mom's the Best Mom (2000)
All the Sincerity in Hollywood (2001)
You Stink! I Love You (2003)
Happy Cat Day (2004)
I Will Kiss You: Lots & Lots & Lots (2006)
Stoo Hample's Book of Bad Manners (2006)
Dread & Superficiality: Woody Allen as Comic Strip (2009)
The Silly Book With CD (2010)

Plays
Alms for the Middle Class
The Asshole Murder Case
Paint the Icebergs
The Most Trusted Man in America
All the Sincerity in Hollywood

Musicals
The Fig Leaves Are Falling (uncredited bookwriter; music by Albert Hague, lyrics by Allan Sherman)
The Selling of the President (co-bookwriter with Jack O'Brien; music by Bob James, lyrics by O'Brien)
Children's Letters to God (bookwriter; music by David Evans, lyrics by Douglas Cohen)

Television
Children's Letters to God (NBC Special)
The Great Radio Comedians (PBS Special)
Kate & Allie (CBS)
That Girl in Wonderland (ABC - animated pilot)
Festival of Family Classics: Snow White and the Seven Dwarfs (ABC - animated)

Comic strips
Inside Woody Allen
Rich & Famous
Children's Letters to God

Magazines
Weekly humor page in New York Magazine called "The Apple," illustrated by Seymour Chwast, 1968
Weekly humor page in New Times Magazine called "Fellow Citizens," illustrated by Seymour Chwast, 1969
Monthly cartoon page in Cat Fancy Magazine called "Tiger's Tales," 2006

References

External links

 Lambiek Comiclopedia article
 New York Times obituary
 The Ohio State University Billy Ireland Cartoon Library & Museum: Stuart Hample Collection guide

1926 births
2010 deaths
American children's writers
American children's book illustrators
American dramatists and playwrights
American illustrators
American comics artists
United States Navy personnel of World War II
Deaths from cancer in New York (state)
American comic strip cartoonists
Writers from New York (state)
University at Buffalo alumni